Gaetano Trentanove (February 21, 1858 – March 13, 1937) was an Italian and American sculptor.

Biography
Trentanove was born in Florence, Italy, a goldsmith's son. He studied at the Florentine Academy; he was later named honorary scholar of this academy and Parma. Trentanove had an active early career in Italy. He completed Gaddo movente (his first work), awarded a gold medal by the Società Promotrice delle Belle Arti. He completed both a full size statue for his palace and a funereal monument for Count Alfredo Serristori for the cemetery of Figline. He sculpted the sculptural group Tito Vezio e Licena. he sculpted the monument of Signora Fraschetti, placing a crown of flowers on the tomb of her husband in San Miniato. He completed many portrait busts including one of Federigo Campanella. He designed a statue raised on the loggie of the Mercato Nuovo of Florence.

Trentanove opened a studio in Milwaukee, Wisconsin, as a result of friendships made in Paris. His initial contact with Milwaukee was made as a student when William E. Cramer, the editor of the Evening Wisconsin, visited Giovanni Dupre's studio, where Trentanove was studying. For the World's Columbian Exposition of 1893, Trentanove sculpted the Otriade or Last of the Spartans, a large white Carrara marble statue. When the Chicago fair closed, Cramer purchased the Spartan statue for the Layton Art Gallery in Milwaukee. Trentanove thus became a regular visitor to Milwaukee and taught classes at the Layton Art Gallery.

Trentanove subsequently acquired American citizenship and although he spent a portion of every year in Florence, where the foundry that cast his models in bronze was located, he passed most of the remainder of his life in Milwaukee. In 1897 Trentanove was created a knight of the Order of the Crown of Italy. After retirement, he returned to Italy where he died.

Trentanove's public monuments are more easily located than his portrait sculptures, figural sculptures and decorative sculpture.

Selected works 
 1889 Victor Hugo, shown at the Exposition Universelle (1889), Paris. Now at Gallery of Modern Art, Florence.
 1892 The Last of the Spartans, Milwaukee Art Museum. Purchased at the Esposizione di Belle Arti, Parma, by William Cramer and donated in 1893 to the Layton Art Gallery, Milwaukee.

 1896 Father Jacques Marquette, National Statuary Hall, U.S. Capitol, Washington, D.C. 
 1897 Father Jacques Marquette, public statue at Marquette, Michigan
 1898 Bust of Peter White Peter White Public Library, Marquette, Michigan
 1900 Daniel Webster for the Daniel Webster Memorial, Scott Circle, Washington, D.C.
 1901 Brigadier General Albert Pike , Judiciary Square, Washington, D.C.. Pulled from its plinth by protestors and set alight on June 19, 2020
 1904 Tadeusz Kościuszko, Cleveland Museum of Art
 1904 Andrew Carnegie bust for Carnegie Library in Atlanta, Georgia.  Now in lobby of the Atlanta-Fulton Public Library System's Central Library.
 1905 General Thaddeus Kosciuszko, Kosciuszko Park, Milwaukee, Wisconsin
 1907 Father Jacques Marquette, public statue at Marquette Park (Mackinac Island)
 Giovanni Villani for a niche of the Loggia del Mercato Nuovo, Florence.
 Soldiers' Monument, Oshkosh, Wisconsin
 Governor Nelson Dewey, Lancaster, Wisconsin
 President McKinley, Somerville, New Jersey
 Oshkosh, commemorating the treaty with the Menominee

References 

 Omaggio a Gaetano Trentanove Exhibition, Accademia delle Arti del Disegno, Florence, December 2005
 A Commemorative History of the Oshkosh Public Library Lions

1858 births
1937 deaths
Sculptors from Florence
Italian emigrants to the United States
Artists from Milwaukee
20th-century American sculptors
20th-century American male artists
19th-century American sculptors
19th-century American male artists
American male sculptors
Accademia di Belle Arti di Firenze alumni
Sculptors from Wisconsin